The 1955 Oregon Webfoots football team represented the University of Oregon as a member of the Pacific Coast Conference (PCC) during the 1955 college football season. In their fifth season under head coach Len Casanova, the Webfoots compiled a 6–4 record (4–3 against PCC opponents), finished in fourth place in the PCC, and outscored their opponents, 204 to 158. The team played home games at Hayward Field in Eugene, Oregon and Multnomah Stadium in Portland, Oregon.

Schedule

References

Oregon
Oregon Ducks football seasons
Oregon Webfoots football